The Solo technical routine competition of the 2022 European Aquatics Championships was held on 12 August 2022.

Results
The final was held on 12 August at 15:00.

References

Artistic